Silhouettes is an album by keyboardist Lonnie Liston Smith, featuring performances recorded and released by the Flying Dutchman label in 1984.

Reception

In his review for AllMusic, Richard S. Ginell stated that the album, "continues the Lonnie Liston Smith string of sweetly ingratiating pop/jazz background albums. If anything, Smith's keyboard work is even more stripped down and lightly melodic than before, and his new cohorts create more mild-mannered, semi-funky backdrops that won't disturb anyone's sleep".

Track listing
All compositions by Lonnie Liston Smith except where noted
 "Warm" (Bob Thiele, Glenn Osser) − 3:09
 "If You Take Care of Me" (Robert Thiele Jr., Davitt Sigerson) − 5:10
 "Silhouettes" − 4:38
 "Summer Afternoon" − 5:49
 "Enlightenment" (Robert Thiele, Jr., Sigerson, Smith) − 4:51
 "City of Lights" (Eric Paul Saunders) − 5:11
 "Once Again Love" (Tom Barney) − 5:02
 "Just Us Two" − 4:17

Personnel
Lonnie Liston Smith − electric piano, acoustic piano
Premik − soprano saxophone, alto flute (tracks 1, 3, 4, 6 & 7)
Joy Askew (tracks 4, 5 & 7), Barry Eastmond (track 2), Robert Thiele, Jr. (tracks 2 & 5) − synthesizer 
Abdul Wuali − guitar (tracks 4-6)
Tom Barney (tracks 2-5 & 7), Anthony Jackson (track 6) − bass 
Buddy Williams − drums (tracks 2-7)
Jimmy Maelen (tracks 1 & 4-6), Kimati Dinizulu (track 1), Robert Thiele Jr. (track 5), Keven P. Green  (track 5), Miles Watson  (track 5), Steve Thornton (tracks 2 & 3) − percussion 
Donald Smith − lead vocals (track 2)
Babi Floyd, Kurt Yahjian − backing vocals (track 2)

References

1984 albums
Doctor Jazz Records albums
Lonnie Liston Smith albums